Events from the year 1549 in Ireland.

Incumbent
Monarch: Edward VI

Events
January – William St Loe is knighted in Dublin for services in Ireland.
Plantation of Leix and Offaly starts (continues until they are established as Queen's and King's Counties in 1557).
Fionnuala Ní Flaithbheartaigh conspires with her brother, Domhnall mac Ruairi Oge O Flaithbheartaigh, to murder her late husband's son Walter Fada Burke and seize his castle and lands of Inverin.

Births
Probable date – Thomas Field, Jesuit explorer (d. 1625)

Deaths
July 31 – Thomas Eustace, 1st Viscount Baltinglass, landowner (b. c.1480)
c. December 23 – Matthew Sanders, Bishop of Leighlin.
Sir Edward Bellingham, former Lord Deputy of Ireland (b. 1506)

References

 
1540s in Ireland
Ireland
Years of the 16th century in Ireland